The Women's 3000 metre relay in short track speed skating at the 2018 Winter Olympics took place on 10 and 20 February 2018 at the Gangneung Ice Arena in Gangneung, South Korea.

Records
Prior to this competition, the existing world and Olympic records were as follows.

Two Olympic records and one world record were set during the competition.

Results

Semifinals
The semifinals were held on 10 February.

Finals

Final B (classification round)

Final A (medal round)
The final was started at 20:29.

References

Women's short track speed skating at the 2018 Winter Olympics